CycleNetXChange  provides a standard format with which to exchange cycle path data, together with information about the quality of routes; This enables computerised transport systems to provide cycle routes.

This UK National Cycle Path network  schema  (CycleNetXChange) defines an exchange  format for an exchange of cycle path data together with information relevant to cycling about the quality of routes; . It is a component of the UK national transport information infrastructure and is based on a number of other UK and ISO standards.

The format allows cycle path data to be collected by different communities and exchanged to provide cycle Journey planners and other navigation products.

The CycleNetXChange schema is in draft and is intended to become  a UK national de facto standard sponsored by the UK Department of Transport. CycleNet is based on the Ordnance Survey DNF (Digital National Framework) for referencing objects and the ITN (Integrated Transport Network) schema and can be used in conjunction with road and map data that conforms to the DNF. 

The standard has been developed by Transport Direct to enable the delivery with Cycling England of as the National Cycle Journey Planner element of the Transport Direct Portal.

Working party

The following people contributed to the development of the standard:
Kevin Bossley: Wherefromhere
Colin Henderson: Ordnance Survey
David Kirton: Camden Consultancy Services
Peter Miller: ITO World
Nick Knowles: Kizoom
Simon Nuttall: CycleStreets
Richard Shaw: WS Atkins
Jonathan Shewell Cooper: Atos Origin
Shane Snow, Department for Transport

See also 
NaPTAN
GovTalk
TransXChange

References

External links 
 
Transport Direct
Cycle Journey Planner

Cycling in the United Kingdom
National Cycle Network